Bogdan Ganev Dochev (26 June 1935 – 29 May 2017) was a Bulgarian footballer and football referee.

He is known for having refereed two matches in the FIFA World Cup, Italy - Cameroon 1-1 in 1982 and Paraguay - Belgium 2-2 in 1986. Dochev was a linesman in the famous Brazil versus Italy match in 1982 and in the game between England and Argentina in 1986 in which the Hand of God and Goal of the Century were scored by Diego Maradona.

References

Profile

External links 
 Player Profile at LevskiSofia.info

1935 births
2017 deaths
Bulgarian footballers
PFC Cherno More Varna players
PFC Spartak Varna players
PFC Levski Sofia players
First Professional Football League (Bulgaria) players
Bulgarian football referees
FIFA World Cup referees
1986 FIFA World Cup referees
1982 FIFA World Cup referees
Sportspeople from Varna, Bulgaria
Association football forwards